Kamna Jethmalani is an Indian actress. She debuted in 2005 with the Telugu film Premikulu and had her first commercial success with her third feature film Ranam. Subsequently, she played the lead role in a number of Telugu-language films, while also debuting and appearing in Tamil, Malayalam and Kannada films.

Early life
Born into a Sindhi Hindu family in Mumbai. Jethmalani is a granddaughter of businessman Shyam Jethmalani. Her pet name is "Dinky". Her mother Divya is a housewife and her father Nimesh Jethmalani is a businessman. She has two siblings - brother Kapil and sister Karishma. Ram Jethmalani is her great-uncle.

She was the runner-up at the Miss Mumbai contest in 2004 and also appeared in the music video of the pop song 'Chhod do Aanchal Zamaana Kya Kahega' by Bombay Vikings & Mera Dadla by Vaishali Samant & Avadhoot Gupte.

Personal life
On 11 August 2014, Kamna married Suraj Nagpal, a Bangalore-based businessman.

Career

She appeared in the video of "Chhod Do Aanchal Zamaana Kya Kahega" by Neeraj Shridhar – Bombay Vikings in 2004. The following year, she made her movie debut with the Telugu film Premikulu. Though that film flopped, her subsequent film Ranam was a big hit. Her first Tamil film was Idhaya Thirudan with Jayam Ravi. She did an item number in the film Sainikudu. She has acted in Machakaaran opposite Jeevan. Since then, she has done several south Indian films, in which she performed the lead role.

Filmography

References

External links

Living people
Sindhi people
Year of birth missing (living people)
Actresses in Telugu cinema
Actresses in Tamil cinema
Actresses in Kannada cinema
Actresses in Malayalam cinema
21st-century Indian actresses
Indian film actresses